The mullets or grey mullets are a family (Mugilidae) of ray-finned fish found worldwide in coastal temperate and tropical waters, and some species in fresh water. Mullets have served as an important source of food in Mediterranean Europe since Roman times. The family includes about 78 species in 20 genera.

Mullets are distinguished by the presence of two separate dorsal fins, small triangular mouths, and the absence of a lateral line organ. They feed on detritus, and most species have unusually muscular stomachs and a complex pharynx to help in digestion.

Classification and naming

Taxonomically, the family is currently treated as the sole member of the order Mugiliformes, but as Nelson says, "there has been much disagreement concerning the relationships" of this family. The presence of fin spines clearly indicates membership in the superorder Acanthopterygii, and in the 1960s, they were classed as primitive perciforms, while others have grouped them in Atheriniformes. They are classified as an order, Mugiliformes, within the subseries Ovalentaria of the clade Percomorpha in the 5th Edition of Fishes of the World.

In North America, "mullet" by itself usually refers to Mugilidae. In Europe, the word "mullet" is usually qualified, the "grey mullets" being Mugilidae and the "red mullets" or "surmullets" being Mullidae, notably members of the genus Mullus. Outside Europe, the Mullidae are often called "goatfish". Fish with common names including the word "mullet" may be a member of one family or the other, or even unrelated such as the freshwater white sucker (Catostomus commersonii).

However, recent taxonomic work has reorganised the family and the following genera make up the Mugilidae:

 Agonostomus Bennett, 1832
 Aldrichetta Whitley, 1945
 Cestraeus Valenciennes, 1836
 Chaenomugil Gill, 1863
 Chelon Artedi, 1763
 Crenimugil Schultz, 1946
 Dajaus Valenciennes, 1836
 Ellochelon Whitley, 1930
 Gracilimugil Whitley, 1941
 Joturus Poey, 1860
 Minimugil Durand, Chen, Shen, Fu & Borsa, 2012
 Mugil Linnaeus, 1758
 Myxus  Günther, 1861
 Neomyxus Steindachner, 1878
 Neochelon Durand, Chen, Shen, Fu & Borsa 2012
 Oedalechilus Fowler 1903
 Osteomugil G. Luther, 1982
 Parachelon Durand, Chen, Shen, Fu & Borsa 2012
 Paramugil Ghasemzadeh, Ivantsoff & Aarn 2004
 Planiliza Whitley, 1945
 Plicomugil Schultz, 1953
 Pseudomyxus Durand, Chen, Shen, Fu & Borsa 2012
 Rhinomugil Gill, 1863
 Sicamugil Fowler, 1939
 Squalomugil Ogilby, 1908
 Trachystoma Ogilby, 1888

Behaviour 
A common noticeable behaviour in mullet is the tendency to leap out of the water. There are two distinguishable types of leaps: a straight, clean slice out of the water to escape predators and a slower, lower jump while turning to its side that results in a larger, more distinguishable, splash. The reasons for this lower jump are disputed, but have been hypothesised to be in order to gain oxygen rich air for gas exchange in a small organ above the pharynx.

Development 
The ontogeny of mugilid larvae has been well studied, with the larval development of Mugil cephalus in particular being studied intensively due to its wide range of distribution and interest to aquaculture. The previously understudied osteological development of Mugil cephalus was investigated in a 2021 study, with four embryonic and six larval developmental steps being described in aquaculture-reared and wild-caught specimens. These descriptions provided clarification of questionable characters of adult mullets and revealed informative details with potential implications for phylogenetic hypotheses, as well as providing an overdue basis of comparison for aquaculture-reared mullets to enable recognition of malformations.

Timeline

References

Further references
 J.S. Nelson, Fishes of the World. .

External links

 Video: Mullet Dursey Sound May 2010, Beara, West Cork, Ireland

 
Mugiliformes
Ovalentaria